The Velódromo Alcides Nieto Patiño is a velodrome in Cali, Colombia. It was opened in 1971 and renovated in 2007. It is a regular location for the UCI Track Cycling World Cup Classics and hosted the 2014 UCI Track Cycling World Championships.

External links
 information at FixedGearFever.com

Velodromes in Colombia
Buildings and structures in Cali
Sport in Cali
Sports venues completed in 1971
1971 establishments in Colombia